Thaddeus Stevens College of Technology (Stevens Tech) is a public technical college in Lancaster, Pennsylvania. It offers twenty-two academic programs for about 1,200 students. It was named for Thaddeus Stevens, a nineteenth-century statesman. The college was founded in 1905 and is accredited by the Middle States Association of Colleges and Schools.

Campus
These include 6 residence halls, a dining hall, a laboratory/classroom building with computer and learning labs, and new and expanded technical laboratory facilities. The Learning Resources Center was completed in the summer of 1995. Also available for student use are an athletic field with a track and a student center.

In April 2019, the school opened the Greiner Campus, a 60,000 square-foot facility dedicated to advanced manufacturing programs. Another campus, called the Transportation Center, was announced in January 2020. This campus, located in the Greenfield Corporate Center, will be the location of the school's automotive technology and collision repair technology classes. The campus is expected to open for the fall 2021 semester.

Leadership

On August 4, 2020, Thaddeus Stevens announced that Pedro Rivera would become the 10th president of the college. Rivera, who previously served as Pennsylvania Secretary of Education and superintendent of the School District of Lancaster, officially started October 1, 2020.

Rankings
Thaddeus Stevens is ranked 9th for Top Two-Year Trade Schools by Forbes in their 2018 rankings.
Thaddeus Stevens has been recognized as a top 150 community college by the Aspen Institute College Excellence Program.

Athletic programs
Thaddeus Stevens is a member of the National Junior College Athletic Association, participating in Division III sports.
Basketball
Cross Country
Football
Track and Field
Wrestling

References

External links
 Official website

Garden State Athletic Conference
Universities and colleges in Lancaster, Pennsylvania
Educational institutions established in 1905
1905 establishments in Pennsylvania
NJCAA athletics